The badminton women's doubles tournament at the 2010 Asian Games in Guangzhou took place from 16 November to 19 November at Tianhe Gymnasium.

Schedule
All times are China Standard Time (UTC+08:00)

Results
Legend
r — Retired
WO — Won by walkover

Final

Top half

Bottom half

References 
 Results
Asian Games Complete Results

External links 
 Bracket

Badminton at the 2010 Asian Games